The 1929 Monaco Grand Prix was the first Grand Prix to be run in the Principality. It was set up by wealthy cigarette manufacturer, Antony Noghès, who had set up the Automobile Club de Monaco with some of his friends. This offer of a Grand Prix was supported by Prince Louis II, and the Monégasque driver of that time, Louis Chiron. On 14 April 1929, their plan became reality, when 16 invited participants turned out to race for a prize of 100,000 French francs.

Classification

Starting grid
Grid positions were determined by a ballot. Philippe Étancelin drew pole position, while main rival Rudolf Caracciola started 15th.

Race

External links

http://sidepodcast.com/post/1929-first-monaco-grand-prix

Monaco
Monaco Grand Prix
Grand Prix